Elguja Vladimirovich Burduli (1 April 1941 — 5 March 2022) was a Soviet and Georgian film actor, singer.

Life and career
Burduli was born in Tbilisi on 1 April 1941. In 1959 he entered the evening department of the Georgian Technical University and studied at the Faculty of Civil Engineering until 1969. He was a lifeguard on the Tbilisi Sea (1958–1969), a member of the Sukhishvili Georgian National Ballet (1961–1964) and a worker at filling station (1964–1984). His acting career started in 1974.

In 2021, Burduli was awarded the title of Honorary Citizen of Tbilisi. Burduli died on 5 March 2022, at the age of 80.

Selected filmography
 Hatred as Prokhor (1977)
 Primary Russia as Belisarius (1985)
 Boris Godunov as Arab merchant (1986)
 Dark Eyes as Arab merchant (1986)
 Hard to Be a God as  Baron Pampa (1989)
 The Sun of the Sleepless  as Gela Bendeliani (1992)
 A Chef in Love  as an old man (1996)
 Going Vertical  as Georgian aksakal  (2017)

References

External links

1941 births
2022 deaths
20th-century male singers from Georgia (country)
21st-century male singers from Georgia (country)
Academicians of the Russian Academy of Cinema Arts and Sciences "Nika"
Actors from Tbilisi
Male film actors from Georgia (country)
Recipients of the Nika Award
Soviet male film actors